Two-time defending champion Rafael Nadal defeated Nicolás Almagro in the final, 6–4, 6–3 to win the singles tennis title at the 2013 Barcelona Open. It was his record-extending eighth Barcelona Open title.

Seeds
All seeds receive a bye into the second round.

Draw

Finals

Top half

Section 1

Section 2

Bottom half

Section 3

Section 4

Qualifying

Seeds

Qualifiers

Lucky losers
  Jan-Lennard Struff

Draw

First qualifier

Second qualifier

Third qualifier

Fourth qualifier

Fifth qualifier

Sixth qualifier

References
 Main Draw
 Qualifying Draw

Barcelona Open Banco Sabadell - Singles